Wesley Koolhof and Neal Skupski defeated Juan Sebastián Cabal and Robert Farah in the final, 6–7(4–7), 6–4, [10–5] to win the men's doubles tennis title at the 2022 Madrid Open. It was their first ATP Masters 1000 title.

Marcel Granollers and Horacio Zeballos were the defending champions, but lost in the quarterfinals to Cabal and Farah.

This tournament marked the final professional appearance of former doubles world No. 3 and Olympic gold medalist Marc López.

Seeds

Draw

Finals

Top half

Bottom half

Seeded teams 
The following are the seeded teams, based on ATP rankings as of April 25, 2022.

Other entry information

Wildcards

Alternates

Withdrawals
Before the tournament
  Marcelo Arévalo /  Jean-Julien Rojer
  Taylor Fritz /  Reilly Opelka → replaced by  Federico Delbonis /  Andrés Molteni
  Sander Gillé /  Joran Vliegen → replaced by  Nikoloz Basilashvili /  Alexander Bublik
  Tim Pütz /  Michael Venus → replaced by  Jamie Murray /  Michael Venus

References

External links
Main draw

Doubles men